The 1970 Scheldeprijs was the 57th edition of the Scheldeprijs cycle race and was held on 28 July 1970. The race was won by Roger De Vlaeminck.

General classification

References

1970
1970 in road cycling
1970 in Belgian sport